The Yale Quartet was a string quartet based at Yale University composed of musicians in the Yale School of Music and formed and led by violinist  Broadus Erle (formerly of the New Music Quartet) from the time he arrived at Yale in 1960. The Yale Quartet is especially acclaimed for their classic recordings of the Beethoven late string quartets, made for the Vanguard label during the late 1960s and early 1970s.
. Violist David Schwartz, who began with the quartet, was later replaced by renowned violist Walter Trampler. Original 2nd Violinist Yoko Matsuda was succeeded by Syoko Aki in 1967; Aki still teaches at Yale, having joined the  faculty in 1968 and violoncellist Aldo Parisot retired from Yale in 2018 at the age of 99, following a 60-year tenure there; he died in December 2018, shortly after his 100th birthday.
After Broadus Erle's premature death in 1977, the Yale Quartet disbanded. 
The Tokyo Quartet was the quartet-in-residence at Yale for most of the period since the late 1970s, until the Brentano String Quartet was appointed to the position in 2013. The Yale's celebrated recordings of the last five Beethoven quartets for Vanguard  have been reissued on compact disc, as have their only other recordings, of two Mozart quartets, K.421 and K.575, and the Brahms piano quintet with André Previn.

Personnel 
1st violin:
Broadus Erle

2nd violin:
Yoko Matsuda (1964-1967)
Syoko Aki

Viola:
David Schwartz
Walter Trampler

Cello:
Aldo Parisot

Recordings 

Beethoven Quartets Op 127 & 131: Erle-Aki-Schwartz-Parisot; Op 132: Erle-Matsuda-Schwartz-Parisot; Op 130, 133, 135: Erle-Aki-Trampler-Parisot). Originally issued on LP: Vanguard Cardinal Series Set VCS-10101.
Brahms Piano Quintet in F minor op 34 (issued 1973), HMV LP ASD 2873 (Erle-Aki-Trampler-Parisot, André Previn piano
Mozart Quartets in D minor K 421 and D major K 575, Cardinal LP VCS 10019 (Erle-Matsuda-Schwartz-Parisot).

References 

American string quartets
Musical groups established in 1960
Yale University musical groups
Yale School of Music
1960 establishments in Connecticut